Valuysky (masculine), Valuyskaya (feminine), or Valuyskoye (neuter) is the name of several rural localities in Russia:
Valuysky, Oryol Oblast, a settlement in Otradinsky Selsoviet of Mtsensky District of Oryol Oblast
Valuysky, Rostov Oblast, a khutor in Sukhovskoye Rural Settlement of Proletarsky District of Rostov Oblast